Kum may refer to:
 Kum, a Slavic form of a godfather or a groomsman, similar to a blood brother
 Kum., an abbreviation of the Indian honorific Kumari, used for unmarried women
 Kum (mountain), a mountain in Slovenia
 Kum, Cantonese form of Qin (surname) (琴) and Jin (Chinese surname) (金) 
 Guqin (a.k.a. Kum or Qin), a Cantonese musical instrument (琴)
 Kum-Kum, an anime
 Qom, a city in Iran
 Qom Province, Iran, whose seat is Qom
 Kum, Mazandaran, Iran
 Kum, a nickname for Ben Wallis
 Kum, West Azerbaijan, Iran
 Qum, Azerbaijan
 Christian Kum, Dutch footballer
 Kumkum (actress) (a.k.a. Kum Kum), Bollywood actress of 1950s–1970s
 Geum River (a.k.a. Kum), a river in South Korea
 Yakushima Airport, whose IATA airport code is "KUM"
 Kumyk language (ISO code kum), a Turkic language spoken by the Kumyks

See also
 Keum (disambiguation)
 Kym (disambiguation)
 Kum & Go
 Cum (disambiguation)
 Come (disambiguation)